You're in Love, Charlie Brown is the fourth prime-time animated television special based upon the comic strip Peanuts, by Charles M. Schulz. It originally aired on CBS on June 12, 1967. This was the second non-holiday-oriented Peanuts special, following Charlie Brown's All Stars!.

Both  and He's Your Dog, Charlie Brown were nominated for an Emmy award for Outstanding Achievement in Children's Programming in 1968.

Plot
With summer approaching, Charlie Brown is upset that he cannot enjoy himself like all the others, but when he sees the Little Red-Haired Girl on a passing bus, Linus figures out that Charlie Brown is in love.  

Charlie Brown pines for the Little Red-Haired Girl, and during the next-to-last day of school, tries to get her attention.  He is called up to read a report to the class but accidentally reads aloud a love note he wrote for her and is laughed at. He then goes to the pencil sharpener and unintentionally sharpens his ball point pen. Lunch hour is no better as he cannot summon the courage to go talk to her, and then panics when the Little Red-Haired Girl approaches him. 

After school, Charlie Brown goes to Lucy's psychiatric booth for advice, but she is too busy longing for Schroeder. He later brings the girl up to Peppermint Patty, but before he can mention her red hair, Patty tells him that she will arrange a meeting with her. She then informs Lucy that someone wants to meet her at the ball park that night. Lucy agrees, thinking the "someone" is Schroeder, and Patty then tells Charlie Brown everything is all set. When the two meet at home plate, they both respond with "You!? Bleah!!"

The next day, the last before summer vacation, Charlie Brown plans to get up early to meet the Little Red-Haired Girl at the bus stop, but he falls asleep on the bench and misses the bus. He arrives late at school and is sent to the principal's office right after yelling at the teacher when asked why he was late. Back in class, he is called on to solve a math problem on the blackboard. Thinking he will finally impress the Little Red-Haired Girl, he struts to the blackboard and writes some large formulas on the board, but when the teacher asks what he is doing, he admits he doesn't know and is again laughed at.

School lets out at noon, and Charlie Brown, now determined to meet the Little Red-Haired Girl, is first out to the school bus to wait for her, but he cannot find her in the clamoring crowd of students. They all get on the bus, and it pulls away, again leaving Charlie Brown behind, wallowing in his misery until he notices a sheet of paper put into his hand that reads: "I Like You, Charlie Brown. signed Little Red Haired Girl".

Charlie Brown's anguish quickly turns into delight and hope as he dances up the hill toward home, saying he cannot wait until September during the closing credits.  At the end of the credits, Charlie Brown stops and asks himself, "Good grief! How will I live until September?"

Cast
Peter Robbins as Charlie Brown
Sally Dryer as Lucy van Pelt
Christopher Shea as Linus van Pelt
Gabrielle DeFaria Ritter as Peppermint Patty
Ann Altieri as Violet
Kathy Steinberg as Sally Brown
Bill Melendez as Snoopy
3 and 4, Frieda, Patty, Pig-Pen, Schroeder, and Shermy appear, but are silent.

End Credits

Created and Written by: Charles M. Schulz
Produced and Directed by: Bill Melendez
Executive Producer: Lee Mendelson
Original Score Composed and Performed by: Vince Guaraldi
Arranged and Conducted by: John Scott Trotter
Graphic Blandishment by: Ed Levitt, Bernard Gruver, Frank Smith, Ruth Kissane, Dean Spille, Rudy Zamora, Beverly Robbins, Bob Carlson, Eleanor Warren, Frank Braxton, Faith Kovaleski, John Walker, Flora Hastings, Russ Von Neida, Gwenn Dotzler
Voices Directed by: Dick Beals
West Hillsborough School Choir Directed by: Al Clover
Editing: Robert T. Gillis
Assisted by: Steven Melendez
Sound by: Producers' Sound Service
Camera: Nick Vasu

Music score
The score was recorded by the Vince Guaraldi Sextet on May 17, 1967, at United Western Recorders, featuring Frank Rosolino (trombone), John Gray (guitar), Ronald Lang (woodwinds), Monty Budwig (double bass) and John Rae (drums).

"It's Spring"
"Charlie Brown Theme" (version 1) (Vince Guaraldi, Lee Mendelson)
"" (version 1, piano)
"" (version 2, vocal) (Guaraldi, Mendelson)
"School Days" (version 1, piano) (Will D. Cobb, Gus Edwards)
"Red Baron"
"Trio Ad-Lib"
"Peppermint Patty" (vamp, version 1)
"Love Will Come"
"" (version 3, minor key)
"" (version 4, theme parody vocal)
"" (version 5, piano + flute)
"Pomp and Circumstance March: No. 1 in D" (Sir Edward Elgar)
"Peppermint Patty" (vamp, version 2)
"Schroeder Practices"
"Schroeder Plays"
"Peppermint Patty" (vamp, version 3)
"Peppermint Patty" (piano + brass)
"Peppermint Patty" (vamp, version 4)
"" (version 6, harpsichord)
"Charlie Brown and His All-Stars" (piano + brass)
"Charlie Brown Theme" (version 2) (Vince Guaraldi, Lee Mendelson)
"School Days" (version 2, horns) (Will D. Cobb, Gus Edwards)
"" (version 7, piano + saxophone, end credits)
"Fanfare Finish"

However, "Peppermint Patty" (piano + horns) was made available as a bonus track on the 2005 CD release of Vince Guaraldi with the San Francisco Boys Chorus (1967). In addition, variations of "Red Baron", "Peppermint Patty", and the eponymous theme song were released on the 1968 album Oh Good Grief!.

Notability

You're In Love, Charlie Brown is notable for at least two important firsts:
It marked the on-screen debut of Peppermint Patty, who was introduced in the classic comic strip the year before.
It was also the first special that used "tromboning" (a muted trombone) in place of adult voices.

Additionally similar to the fight sequences of the 1966 Batman series, it was the only known Peanuts special in which the more intense sound effects are actually spelled out in onomatopoeic words: wiggly "R"s when Charlie Brown's alarm clock goes off, and very hard, straight words "Click Clack" and "Clack" when he opens some school doors silently getting to school late (however, in The Charlie Brown and Snoopy Show episode "Linus and Lucy" the word "Pow" can be seen when Snoopy punches somebody in Sally's class).

This special was rebroadcast yearly on CBS from June 1968 to June 1972. It was first released on home video in 1981 on RCA's SelectaVision CED format as part of the A Charlie Brown Festival compilation. The special was released on VHS by Kartes Video Communications in 1987. It was also paired with Snoopy's Getting Married, Charlie Brown on a 2-pack in 1989. Paramount Home Media Distribution would release the special along with It's Your First Kiss, Charlie Brown on the Snoopy Double Feature: Volume 4 VHS on January 11, 1995.

Along with the special It's Your First Kiss, Charlie Brown, this was released to DVD as a bonus feature on the Be My Valentine, Charlie Brown-Remastered Deluxe Edition DVD on January 15, 2008. On July 7, 2009, it was re-released on DVD, in remastered form as part of the DVD box set, "Peanuts 1960s Collection." It was released on the Happiness is Peanuts: Friends Forever DVD on December 27, 2011.

References

External links

1960s animated television specials
CBS television specials
Peanuts television specials
Television shows directed by Bill Melendez
1967 television specials
1967 in American television
Television shows written by Charles M. Schulz
1960s American television specials